The Irish Lunatic Asylums for the Poor Act 1817 was an act of Parliament of the United Kingdom. It made Ireland the first nation in the world to require a national system of publicly funded asylums (which were a major source of wealth for the economy and a large provider of jobs in many towns), before this expanded to the rest of the United Kingdom. It also constituted the first time that a national bureaucratic system had been established by colonial social welfare policy It led to the creation of a provincial asylum in each province.

Background 
The Report of the Select Committee to Consider the State of the Lunatic Poor in Ireland (1817) was the main influence toward the creation and subsequent passing of the bill.

References 

Mental health legal history of the United Kingdom
United Kingdom Acts of Parliament 1817